Charles Kerry Bagshaw  (5 October 1943 – 11 November 2015) was a British Royal Marine and spy who was head of MI6's station in Moscow at the time of the collapse of the Soviet Union.

In May 1999 his name was among 116 leaked to the publication Executive Intelligence Review and later posted on the internet.

References

1943 births
2015 deaths
Royal Marines officers
Members of the Order of the British Empire
British spies against the Soviet Union
Secret Intelligence Service personnel